Sir George McLaren Brown, KBE (29 January 1865 – 28 June 1939) was a Canadian railway administrator. He worked for Canadian Pacific Railway from 1887 to 1936, eventually becoming its European general manager.

During the First World War, Brown was Assistant Director-General of Movements and Railways at the War Office. For his service, in 1919 he was appointed a Knight Commander of the Order of the British Empire "For valuable services rendered in connection with the War".

References 

 https://www.ukwhoswho.com/view/10.1093/ww/9780199540891.001.0001/ww-9780199540884-e-206750

1865 births
1939 deaths
Canadian railway executives
Canadian Knights Commander of the Order of the British Empire
Upper Canada College alumni